The Ekushey Book Fair, officially called Amar Ekushey Grantha Mela, is the national book fair of Bangladesh. It is arranged each year by Bangla Academy and takes place for the whole month of February in Dhaka. This event is dedicated to the martyrs who died on 21 February 1952 in Bengali Language Movement, a demonstration calling for the establishment of Bengali as one of the state languages of former East Pakistan.

History

Muktodhara Publishing house started a little sale in front of Bangla Academy in the 21 February 1972, the Shaheed Day, later International Mother Language Day. Chittaranjan Saha of Muktodhara took the initiative. Later, other book publishers joined unofficially. Gradually it became official and the most popular book fair in Bangladesh.

Bangla Academy took over organization of the fair in 1978. In 1984, it was named 'Amar Ekushey Book Fair'. Notably in 1990s, another national book fair called Dhaka International Book Fair was initiated. This book fair is organized by the government in December every year.

Boi Mela started merely as a book fair; but in course of time, it has evolved into a national cultural festival reflecting the cultural spirit of the modern Bengali nation. In addition to book sales, Bangla Academy organizes literary and cultural events every fair-day. Thousands of people gather to purchase books and spend time with the company of books and their authors with a patriotic zeal. There is no entry fee. Publishers of Bangladesh take year-long preparation to publish a huge number of books during this month.

In 2008, 362 book stalls were set up by publishers, book sellers and such other organization including Bangla Academy and Nazrul Institute. The venue of the book festival and outside is decorated with banners, festoons and placards in conformity with the spirit of 'Amar Ekushey'. It is the cultural reunion of Bangladesh where nearly every writing-related person comes. Attracted by discounted price (25% to 32%), readers rush there. Given the importance, generally head of the government inaugurates the fair on the first day of February. TV stations live broadcast the inaugural ceremony.

Structure
Usually, the fair continues from 1 February to 28 February. It takes place in Bangla Academy premises and Suhrawardi Udyan. The Ministry of Culture is in control of the fair while the Academy does the groundwork. Usually the Prime Minister (or the Chief Adviser in case of caretaker government) inaugurates the fair. Between 300 and 400 publishing houses take part in the fair. Only the Bangladeshi booksellers can join who have at least 25 books of their own.

There is Nazrul Moncho, a corner dedicated to poet Kazi Nazrul Islam, a fixed place for month-long cultural meetings, a Lekhok Kunjo, a dedicated place for writers and, a media center for the journalists. Free WiFi service has been enabled since 2019. Nowadays it becomes harder to accommodate the huge crowd and the increasing number of publishers. In 2008, the theme of daily conference was 'Bengali Literature and Culture - Achievement of three decades'.

Recent fairs

2008
2008 Ekushey Book Fair was held from 1 to 29 February 2008. As many as 288 publishers participated. A record number of books were published on the occasion. According to official statistics, the number of books published in connection with the book fair was 2578. The sale proceeds from books sold shot up to a record of Taka 200 million.

2021 
2021 Ekushey Book Fair faced COVID-19 related crisis. The book fair was shifted in March instead of February. But the attendance was very low and a lot of publisher didn't participate in the fair. The fair was also shortened.

2022
A sudden spike in the COVID-19 cases put the risk of organizing 2022 Ekushey Book Fair. With strict mask-wearing policy, the Boi Mela was organized and was much more successful compared to the previous year. Ekushey Book Fair started on February 15 in 2022, instead of February 1 and extended till March 17.

Citations

Notes

References

External links
 Bangla Academy

Book fairs in Bangladesh
Cultural festivals in Dhaka
Bengali language movement